The 2018 Bangladeshi presidential election was held on 18 February 2018. It was the seventh presidential election held since the Twelfth Amendment changed how the president gets elected. The tenure of the incumbent president was set to end on April 23, 2018. Earlier, on January 25, 2018, the Election Commission announced the election schedule. Incumbent president Abdul Hamid was nominated for the second time as the candidate to run for election by the ruling party. Hamid was declared president by the Election Commission as no other candidate submitted nomination papers to the commission. He was sworn in by the Speaker of the Jatiya Sangsad Shirin Chaudhury on April 24, 2018. With the result of the election, Hamid became the first incumbent president to be reelected in the history of Bangladesh.

References

Uncontested elections
Presidential
Presidential elections in Bangladesh
President